Tessellana is a genus of bush crickets in the subfamily Tettigoniinae and tribe Platycleidini. Species can be found throughout mainland Europe, the Middle East and North Africa.

Species 
The Orthoptera Species File
Tessellana carinata Berland & Chopard, 1922
Tessellana lagrecai Messina, 1979
Tessellana nigrosignata Costa, 1863
Tessellana orina Burr, 1899
Tessellana tessellata (Charpentier, 1825) - type species (as Locusta tessellata Charpentier = T. t. tessellata)
Tessellana veyseli Koçak, 1984

References

External links 

Orthoptera of Europe
Ensifera genera
Tettigoniidae